Frank J. Shortner (November 10, 1890 – April 8, 1968) was an American politician and businessman.

Born in the town of Richfield in Wood County, Wisconsin, Shortner and his family moved to Edgar, Wisconsin in 1900. He was in the real estate, banking, and insurance businesses. He served with the Edgar Volunteer Fire Department and was a justice of the peace. Shortner was President of the Village of Edgar and postmaster of the village. In 1933, Shortner served in the Wisconsin State Assembly as a Democrat.

Notes

1890 births
1968 deaths
People from Marathon County, Wisconsin
People from Wood County, Wisconsin
Businesspeople from Wisconsin
American justices of the peace
Mayors of places in Wisconsin
Wisconsin postmasters
20th-century American judges
20th-century American politicians
20th-century American businesspeople
Democratic Party members of the Wisconsin State Assembly